The Galician Healthcare Service (SERGAS) is the publicly funded healthcare system of Galicia, Spain.

Healthcare policy and funding is the responsibility of the Ministry of Health (Consellería de Saúde), a department of the Galician regional government of the Autonomous Community, the Xunta de Galicia. The current Minister for Health (Conselleira) is María Pilar Farjas Abadía.

External links
 SERGAS website

Medical and health organisations based in Spain
Organizations established in 1989
1989 establishments in Spain
Organisations based in Galicia, Spain